Taylor Davis may refer to:

 Taylor Davis (artist) (born 1959), American artist and teacher
 Taylor Davis (violinist) (born 1987), American violinist, arranger, and composer
 Taylor Davis (baseball) (born 1989), American baseball catcher